Doyrentsi is a village in Lovech Municipality, Lovech Province, northern Bulgaria. In 2013, the population was 1090.

References

Villages in Lovech Province